The Diocese of Great Falls–Billings is one of two Catholic dioceses in the U.S. state of Montana in the United States.  The diocese was established in 1904, and formerly constituted the eastern half of the Diocese of Helena. The see was originally located only in the city of Great Falls, Montana, from which the diocese drew its original name. In 1980, the diocese's name was changed to reflect its new co-see in the city of Billings, Montana.

History

Pope Pius X erected the "Diocese of Great Falls" on May 18, 1904, by dividing the Diocese of Helena, which previously comprised the entire state. For its first 76 years, it was called the "Diocese of Great Falls". Bishop Thomas J. Murphy changed the name of the diocese on February 14, 1980, adding "Billings" and changing the way that "Great Falls" was translated into Latin. The diocese has two cathedrals: St Ann's Cathedral in Great Falls, which was dedicated on December 15, 1907, and St Patrick's Co-Cathedral in Billings, which was dedicated on March 1, 1908. The co-patrons of the diocese are Saint Matthias, whose feast day is May 14 and who was the patron saint of the first diocesan bishop, and Saint Pius X, whose feast day is August 21 and who, while pope, erected the diocese.

The Confraternity of Christian Doctrine (CCD) was established in the diocese in 1930. That year, newly consecrated Bishop Edwin O'Hara visited St. Anthony Guild Press in Paterson, New Jersey, where he met editor Miriam Marks. He was deeply impressed with Marks' organizing capabilities, and asked her to help him to establish CCD in the Diocese of Great Falls. CCD had not been widely adopted in the United States, and Bishop O'Hara was particularly concerned at the lack of doctrinal education among rural Catholics. Bishop O'Hara worked hard to implement CCD throughout his diocese, and the United States. His efforts led to a revitalization of CCD and rapid adoption of it throughout the country. Bishop O'Hara extended CCD to adults as well, promoting the establishment of neighborhood groups of four to six people to study a single work for eight weeks, twice a year. By 1934, more than 400 adult CCD groups existed in the Diocese of Great Falls. The movement spread nationwide, with tens of thousands of groups.

In the 1960s, Auxiliary Bishop (later Bishop of the diocese) Eldon B. Schuster played a major role in world Catholic affairs. He participated in the Second Vatican Council, and submitted a written document asking the body to immediately issue a declaration on religious liberty. He was close to Raymond Hunthausen, Bishop of the Diocese of Helena (later Archbishop of Seattle), with whom he shared a deep desire to improve ecumenical efforts with other Christian churches.

In 2005, the Northern Cheyenne Tribe sued the St. Labre Indian School and the Diocese of Great Falls-Billings, alleging that both organizations used the tribe's poverty to raise millions of dollars—and shared almost none of it with the tribal people themselves. The lawsuit claimed breach of contract, cultural genocide, fraud, and unjust enrichment. In 2013 the Montana Supreme Court reversed parts of a lower court ruling dismissing the suit, but said the tribe had failed to prove allegations of breach of contract, negligent misrepresentation, fraud and wrongful conversion. It threw out claims of cultural genocide.
The tribe and St. Labre School reached an out-of-court settlement in December 2014, under which the tribe agreed to drop all charges except that of unjust enrichment, and to pass public resolutions approving of the diocese's and school's use of tribal indicia (so long as compensation payments are made). In turn, the school agreed to make an immediate payment to the tribe of $6 million in 2014, $1 million per year beginning in 2015 and ending in 2019, and $60,000 per year beginning in 2020 for each year the school remains on tribal land.

Sexual abuse suits and bankruptcy
In 2012, the first of several sexual abuse lawsuits was filed against the diocese, alleging abuse of both boys and girls by men and women employed by the diocese. More than 60 plaintiffs had joined the suits by April 2015.

In 2016, the diocese created the Diocese of Great Falls-Billings Juridic Persons Capital Assets Support Corporation (the "Capital Assets Support Corporation", or CASC), a nonprofit organization to which it transferred most of its cash and assets by the end of the year. Diocesan officials believed they could protect the church's assets from victim claims, even though the diocese maintained an interlocking board of directors with the CASC and controlled it. The CASC did not pay for the assets the diocese gave it.

By 2017, the diocese faced more than 400 potential sexual abuse lawsuits. On March 31, 2017, just weeks before the first sexual abuse trials were to begin, the diocese filed for Chapter 11 bankruptcy to protect itself from settlements in these cases. It was the 15th American diocese to file for bankruptcy in the face of sexual abuse victim lawsuits. The diocese agreed to compensate 72 individuals who had already filed suit against it, and the diocese and its insurers proposed establishing a fund to compensate known and unknown victims. Victims' attorneys and other church creditors subsequently filed suit against the diocese in January 2018, alleging that the diocese illegally triggered its bankruptcy by turning over its assets and cash to CASC and that the diocese created CASC in a fraudulent attempt to hide its assets. Victims' legal representatives argued in their court filings that assets of 14 of the 50 parishes should be considered diocesan assets and subject to entailment by victims. In response to this lawsuit, the diocese filed a motion with the federal district court asking for its bankruptcy proceeding to be dismissed.

Another 14 victims came forward after the bankruptcy filing.

Although diocesan officials declared on March 14, 2018, that negotiations between the church and victims had failed and the two sides were far apart, church and victim legal representatives jointly announced a tentative settlement on April 24, 2018. Although not announced at the time, the two sides said the financial terms were roughly the same as those reached by the bankrupt Roman Catholic Diocese of Helena in 2015. Additional terms included requirements that the diocese begin "intensive background checks and screening of potential seminarians" and that the church make public a list of all known abusers, past and present, named in lawsuits.

A federal court approved the diocesan bankruptcy plan in August 2018. About $20 million ($ in  dollars) was paid to 86 victims, with the diocese agreeing to set aside another $1.75 million ($ in  dollars) to cover administrative costs and to compensate victims who came forward in the future. The $20 million in settlement funds came from Catholic Mutual, the diocese's liability insurer ($8 million), the diocese itself ($4 million), individual parishes in the diocese ($4 million), Capital Asset Support Corporation ($2 million), the Catholic Foundation of Eastern Montana ($1 million), and St. Labre Indian School ($1 million). The 86 victims were to receive their payments within a month.

Bishops
The past bishops of the diocese and their tenures of service:

Bishops of Great Falls
 Mathias Clement Lenihan (1904-1930)
 Edwin Vincent O'Hara (1930-1939), appointed Bishop of Kansas City; later elevated to Archbishop (ad personam) in 1954
 William Joseph Condon (1939-1967)
 Eldon Bernard Schuster (1967-1977)
 Thomas Joseph Murphy (1978-1980), title changed with title of diocese

Bishops of Great Falls-Billings
 Thomas Joseph Murphy (1980-1987), appointed Coadjutor Archbishop of Seattle and subsequently succeeded to that see
 Anthony Michael Milone (1987-2006)
 Michael William Warfel (2007–present)

Coadjutor Bishops of Great Falls-Billings
 Jeffrey M. Fleming (2022-present)

Former auxiliary bishops
Eldon Bernard Schuster (1961-1967), appointed Bishop of Great Falls

Schools and hospitals
The diocese contains three Catholic high schools: Billings Central Catholic High School in Billings; Great Falls Central Catholic High School in Great Falls; and St. Labre Indian Catholic High School in Ashland.  A Catholic university, the University of Providence (sponsored by the Sisters of Providence), is located in Great Falls.

Two Catholic acute-care hospitals also exist within the diocese:  Holy Rosary Healthcare in Miles City and St. Vincent Healthcare in Billings (both sponsored by the Sisters of Charity of Leavenworth).

References
Notes

Citations

External links

Roman Catholic Diocese of Great Falls–Billings Official Site 
St. Ann's Cathedral - Great Falls - website
St. Patrick's Cathedral - Billings - website
Billings Catholic Schools - website
Great Falls Central High School - official site

Arms

 
Great Falls
Diocese of Great Falls
Christian organizations established in 1904
Great Falls
Great Falls
1904 establishments in Montana
Companies that filed for Chapter 11 bankruptcy in 2017